Rybka is a 2007 Russian animated film.

Plot
A small child's world is wonderful and extremely complex. A seemingly unimportant event can lead to a tragic disaster in a child's life. On the other hand, the kindness of a baby's soul is capable to work a miracle. The miracle then animates a tiny fish.

Production note

The film "Rybka" is made at a home, outside of a professional studio. All the required equipment - the lighting, camera holder and also shooting multi-level machine - were made by hand especially for the creation of this project. The animation technique "cut-out" was used at the production. And 2 piping voices of the director's children can be heard in the film.

Awards
 2007 — XII Open Russian Animation Film Festival in Suzdal (Russian Federation), – Special prize
 2007 — XVII International Film Forum «Gold Knight» (Russian Federation), – The Silver Knight prize
 2007 — XII Russian Festival of Visual Arts «Orlenok» (Russian Federation), – The Diploma
 2007 — XII Moscow International Children Animation Festival «Gold Fish» (Russian Federation), – Prize for the best cartoon film for children
 2007 — IV Orthodox Children Film Festival «Effulgent Angel» (Russian Federation), – The Diploma
 2007 — International Animated Festival «Animayovka» (Belarus), – Special prize
 2007 — International Film Festival for Children and Youth Audience «Listopadik» (Belarus), – Prize for the best debut
 2008 — III International Sretensky Orthodox Film Festival «Vstrecha» (Russian Federation), – Prize for the best animation film «Crystal Candlestick»
 2008 — XV Contest of Student Films and Debuts «St. Anna» (Russian Federation), – The Diploma
 2008 — International Film Festival «Nueva Mirada» for Children and Youth (Argentina), – «Golden Kite» to the best short film for children
 2008 — Sapporo Short Fest (Japan), – Prize for best children short; Children's Choice Silver Award
 2008 — International Orthodox Film Festival «Pokrov» (Ukraine), – Prize for the best animation film; The Diploma
 2008 — V China International Animation and Digital Arts Festival (China), – Special distinction award in short film category
 2008 — International Festival of Audiovisual Production for Children and Adolescents «Kolibri» (Bolivia), – Special Mention of the Jury in the Animation Category
 2008 — Bradford Animation Festival (England), – Award for best film for children
 2009 — Festival der Nationen (Austria), — Ebenseer Bären in Silber
 2009 — Animae Caribe Animation & New Media Festival (Trinidad and Tobago), — Most Outstanding Animation

Stills

External links
 The information about animated film "Rybka" at Animator.ru
 
 "Rybka" at the Berlinale

2007 films
Russian coming-of-age films
2000s children's fantasy films
Russian animated short films
2007 short films
2000s animated short films